The MTV Europe Music Awards 2006 were held in Copenhagen at the Bella Center. The outside stage hosted a concert that featured The Killers, Keane and Snoop Dogg.

Presenters included Fat Joe, Timbaland and Moby. Notable events during the ceremony included Kanye West infamously invading the stage when Justice vs. Simian went to collect the award for the 'Best Video' category.

Nominations
Winners are in bold text.

Regional nominations
Winners are in bold text.

Performances 
Justin Timberlake — "SexyBack / My Love / LoveStoned"
Nelly Furtado — "Maneater"
Muse — "Starlight"
The Killers — "When You Were Young"
Keane — "Is It Any Wonder?"
P. Diddy and Cassie — "Come to Me"
Rihanna — "SOS"
Snoop Dogg (featuring Pharrell Williams) — "Drop It Like It's Hot"
Outlandish — "I'm Callin' You"
Jet — "Rip It Up"
Lordi — "Hard Rock Hallelujah"

Appearances 
Moby — presented Best Alternative
Sugababes — presented Best Male
Timbaland — presented Best Video
Lordi — presented Best Rock
Daniel Craig and Mads Mikkelsen — presented Best Female
Lars Ulrich — presented Future Sound
Fat Joe — presented Best Hip-Hop
Adrien Brody — presented Best Group
Cassie and Tiziano Ferro — presented Best Pop
Kelis — presented Best R&B
Pharrell Williams — presented Best Song

See also
2006 MTV Video Music Awards

References

External links
"Justin Timberlake to host the EMA's 2006" MTV Europe, September 19, 2006.
MTV Europe Official site.
MTV Europe Music Awards Official show site.
Copenhagen For Partiers - The Ultimate Copenhagen Tourist Guide

2006 in Denmark
Culture in Copenhagen
2006 music awards
2006
2000s in Copenhagen
2006 in Danish music
November 2006 events in Europe